The Legend of Al, John and Jack is a 2002 crime comedy film directed by Aldo, Giovanni & Giacomo and Massimo Venier.

Plot 
The story is set in New York in 1958. Three gangsters, namely Al, John and Jack, by pretending to watch a film in a drive-in theater, are spying on Sam Genovese, the most wanted mob boss of the city. Genovese, nicknamed "chicken thigh" after his favourite food, plans to kill one of his men who betrayed him, and the three gangsters are there because they want to record the killing and send it to the FBI. But, when Genovese is about to pull the trigger, he chokes on the food he is eating. The traitor saves him and is pardoned, and, while the gangsters are about to leave, Al is electrocuted by a cable and lose his memory.

Some days later, the gangsters–Al Caruso, nicknamed "Four-fingers", Johnny Gresko, also known as "Handsome Johnny", and Jack Amoruso, nicknamed "Not-all-donuts-come-out-with-a-hole Jack"–are in a hotel room; due to the electrocution Al got a rare syndrome which erases his memory every time he fells asleep. They tell him the whole story: four days before, it was Jack's birthday. Johnny got him a book about Caravaggio (who the little schooled Jack calls "Carabbaggio" due to his heavy Sicilian accent) and Al got him a new gun. They work for Genovese, but they are clumsy and unreliable: they recently killed a barber, "Counter-hair" Frankie, because they mistakenly thought he was "Rubber-ass" Frankie, a traitor who used to collaborate with FBI. Also, whilst in a pub run by Genovese's gang, they start a shootout because Jack confuses a gangster with "Sewer Rat" Frank, a gangster he thought was dissolved in acid.

Genovese give them one last chance: they have to pick up his old aunt at the bus station and carry her around the town. But, as soon as they meet the old lady, Jack kills her, accidentally shooting with his new gun, which is defective. (According to Johnny, the gun shot because Jack "held the barrel up", something he already told him not to do seven times.)

The three run away and hide at Herbert's home; Herbert is Al's homosexual brother who will later turn out being in love with Johnny. They make up a plan in order to betray Genovese and get him arrested by the FBI thanks to the proofs of him killing the man at the drive-in, but the plan fails. So they make up a new one: they'll fake an attempt to Genovese's life and will foil it: Al will hide in the wardrobe in Genovese's hotel room and wait for the room service to deliver him the meal; John and Jack will hide the gun in the tray. When the room service will enter the room, Al will jump out the wardrobe, pick the gun and kill the waiter, and then they'll explain the "attempt" and obtain Genovese's mercy.

By climbing the outer wall of the hotel, Al avoids the boss' bodyguards, "Wooden back" Tom and "Shithands" Sam, and gets into Genovese's room, but before the arrival of Genovese, he hears the news. A guy named Calogero Buccheri is missing. His most particular sign are the missing pinky on his left hand and a very rare syndrome which erases his memory every time he fells asleep. Al understands the truth: he is Calogero Buccheri. John and Jack, it turns out, are named La Paglia, and they are two scammers who planned to fake Buccheri's kidnapping and accuse Genovese of it, so they could obtain the reward. The two of them, along with some policemen, break into Genovese's room, but Al is no more in the wardrobe. He was planning to leave and return to his family, but he changed his mind and hid under the bed. They find him and Genovese gets arrested for kidnapping. Al forgives John and Jack and returns home.

Two years later, John and Jack are broke again. They spent all their money, but hear at the radio that Hurricane Hogan, a very famous boxeur, will pay $5,000 to the man who will beat him. Calogero Buccheri goes missing again.

Cast
Aldo Baglio as Al
Giovanni Storti as John
Giacomo Poretti as Jack
Aldo Maccione as Sam Genovese
Antonio Catania as Fred
Giovanni Esposito as Frank Contropelo
Ivano Marescotti as Chief of police
Paolo Dell'Orto as Null
Marco Beretta as Ben
Giovanni Cacioppo as Tom "Wooden Back"
Frank Crudele as Sam "Shit Hands"

Accolades

References

External links
 

2002 comedy films
2002 films
Films directed by Massimo Venier
2000s crime comedy films
Italian crime comedy films
2000s Italian-language films
Films set in the United States
Mafia comedy films
2000s American films